Girolamo di Giovanni di Camerino was an Italian painter, and is generally supposed to be the son of Giovanni Boccati, and was the painter of an altar-piece at Santa Maria del Pozzo in Monte San Martino, near Fermo, and represents the Madonna and Child, and four Angels, between SS. Thomas and Cyprian (1473).

See also 
 Da Varano
 Giovanni Boccati
 Giovanni Angelo d'Antonio

References

15th-century Italian painters
Italian male painters
Renaissance painters
Year of death unknown
Year of birth unknown